Yevgeny Kafelnikov was the defending champion, but lost in the semifinals to Tim Henman.

Cédric Pioline won in the final 6–7(3–7), 6–4, 7–6(7–4), against Tim Henman.

Seeds

  Yevgeny Kafelnikov (semifinals)
  Nicolas Kiefer (quarterfinals)
  Magnus Norman (quarterfinals)
  Nicolás Lapentti (first round)
  Tim Henman (final)
  Thomas Enqvist (first round)
  Greg Rusedski (quarterfinals)
  Cédric Pioline (champion)

Draw

Finals

Top half

Bottom half

External links
 Draw

Singles
2000 ATP Tour